The 1895 Sewanee Tigers football team represented the Sewanee Tigers of Sewanee: The University of the South during the 1895 Southern Intercollegiate Athletic Association football season. It was the inaugural season of the Southern Intercollegiate Athletic Association (SIAA). Led by William Ayres Reynolds in his first and only season as head coach, the Tigers compiled an overall record of 2–2–1 with a mark of 0–2 in conference play.

Schedule

References

Sewanee
Sewanee Tigers football seasons
Sewanee Tigers football